Fort Amherstburg was built by the Royal Canadian Volunteers at the mouth of the Detroit River to replace Fort Detroit, which Britain was required to cede to the United States of America in 1796 as a result of the Jay Treaty.

Built in the years before the War of 1812, Fort Amherstburg included "King's Navy Yard" for shipbuilding on the upper Great Lakes (Lakes Erie, Huron, and Superior).  The War of 1812 began and escalated quickly with US General William Hull invading Canada in July 1812. Soldiers from the fort repelled the Americans at River Canard.  After General Hull retreated back to Fort Detroit, British General Isaac Brock and the Shawnee Chief Tecumseh met at Fort Amherstburg to plan the attack of Fort Detroit in the British Indian Department building located outside of the fort grounds.  After losing the Battle of Lake Erie (including the flagship , which was built at the nearby Navy Yard Park), the British/Canadians destroyed the fort and retreated as most of the cannons normally placed in the bastions were put onto the ships to be used for the engagement on Lake Erie and subsequently were lost.

The Americans built a new, smaller fort on the same site with a reduced perimeter. The north-west bastion and connected wall still remain today .  After the end of the war, the British/Canadians reclaimed (what is now) Southern Ontario and Fort Malden.

After the War of 1812, the British let the fort fall into disrepair until threats of rebellion grew in Upper Canada. The fort was repaired to full military use and was garrisoned with men from the 34th Regiment of Foot (made famous for their routing the French 34th regiment during the Napoleonic wars).

After the 1837 rebellion was ended, the Fort again was not necessary as a military installation. It was changed from a military institution to a psychiatric institution. Its employees resided in the smallest barracks building, and the other two large barracks housed inmates sorted by gender. Trees were planted on and around the fort property to provide much-needed shade, which had not been wanted by the military as it would have obscured their view of an attacking force.  After some time, the psychiatric institution moved to St. Catharines, Ontario, where it still exists today.

After that second use for the grounds ended, the fort property was used as a woodmill until the property was sold off as private residences.  The two large barracks buildings are no longer on the grounds. One was moved into the town of Amherstburg where it burned down during the 1920s while being used as a stable.  The other barracks building technically still exists today. It has been moved from the fort grounds, divided up into three and sold as individual residences. They maintain the same shape as they had had as barracks, and at least one of the houses was found to have its original walls  still intact.

Fort Amherstburg still continues today in a military tradition and is a historic site (known as Fort Malden) that is frequently visited by tourists from around the world.  Every Canada Day, an 1812 6-pounder field cannon is fired before a large display of fireworks is commenced.  The Fort is garrisoned with summer staff who wear the same pattern of uniform and ladies who wear clothing styles of the early 19th century.  Visitors can see what fort life was like in the early 19th century through cooking demonstrations and musket firing demonstrations.  The biggest event at Fort Malden would be on the Canadian Civic Holiday weekend where re-enactors of time periods ranging from Ancient Rome to World War II gather and perform combat demonstrations and have a full encampment.

Structures

The first fort consisted of:

 ordnance blockhouse/barrack
 guard house
 powder magazine
 Indian Department Storehouse
 Indian Department Council House
 Indian Department Storekeeper's Residence
 privy
 fire engine shed
 ordnance shed 
 kitchen.

The second fort had:

 large barracks 
 officer's barracks
 guardhouse
 jail

Numerous other buildings dotted the fort.

Affiliations
The Museum is affiliated with: CMA,  CHIN, and Virtual Museum of Canada.

See also
 Chronology of the War of 1812
 War of 1812 Campaigns
 List of forts
 Upper Canada

References

External links
 Fort Malden National Historic Site of Canada
 "Fort Amherstburg in the War of 1812" by Bob Garcia

History museums in Ontario
War of 1812 forts
Forts in Ontario
Amherstburg, Ontario
History of Essex County, Ontario